Jesús David Ferreira Castro (born December 24, 2000) is an American professional soccer player who plays as a forward for Major League Soccer club FC Dallas and the United States national team.

Born in Colombia, Ferreira moved to Dallas, Texas, at the age of 10 after his father, David Ferreira, signed with FC Dallas. He joined the club's youth side and progressed through the ranks before signing a homegrown contract in 2016. He scored his first professional goal on his debut in June 2017 against Real Salt Lake. In 2018, Ferreira was loaned to United Soccer League side Tulsa Roughnecks where he scored six goals in 14 matches, including his first career hat-trick. The next season, Ferreira returned to FC Dallas and broke through as a starter under coach Luchi Gonzalez. In January 2022, Ferreira signed a designated player contract with Dallas.

Ferreira made his senior debut for the United States in February 2020 against Costa Rica. He was then part of the under-23 side that failed to qualify for the Summer Olympics in March 2020. Ferreira scored his first two goals for the United States in January 2021 against Trinidad and Tobago.

Club career
Ferreira moved from Colombia to Dallas when he was 10 years old. He signed a homegrown player contract with FC Dallas on November 17, 2016. He made his professional debut on June 3, 2017, as a 71st minute substitute during a 6–2 win over Real Salt Lake, scoring his first goal in the 89th minute of the game.

In May 2018, Ferreira was loaned to Tulsa Roughnecks FC and scored his first goal for Tulsa on August 18, 2018, against Real Monarchs and his first career hat-trick on September 5, 2018, against Seattle Sounders FC 2.

On December 10, 2019, Ferreira signed a four-year contract with FC Dallas.

Ferreira recorded his first career MLS brace on August 29, 2021, scoring twice in a 5-3 victory over Austin FC. 

On January 18, 2022, Ferreira signed a designated player contract with FC Dallas, keeping him at the club until 2025. Ferreira was selected as MLS player of the week in week 4 of the 2022 season after recording a hat-trick and an assist for FC Dallas in their 4–1 victory over the Portland Timbers. In week two of the 2023 season, Ferreira was named to the league's Team of the Matchday after registering a brace in a 3–1 win over LA Galaxy.

International career
Prior to obtaining United States citizenship, Ferreira attended United States Soccer Federation youth camps. In 2016, Ferreira was called up to the United States under-17 squad. In 2019, Ferreira received a call-up to the United States under-23 team ahead of qualifying games for the 2020 Summer Olympics. After that had been postponed due to Covid, he was called up again to the 2020 CONCACAF Men's Olympic Qualifying Championship team. The team would fail to qualify for the Olympics.

Ferreira made his first senior U.S. camp in January 2020. On February 1, 2020, he made his senior international debut for the United States in its friendly against Costa Rica. On January 31, 2021, Ferreira scored his first and second goals at that level and was named Man of the Match in a game following his second January camp with the senior team. 

On June 10, 2022, Ferreira scored his first international hat-trick by scoring four goals against Grenada during the 2022–23 CONCACAF Nations League.

Personal life
Jesús is the son of David Ferreira, a professional player who played for clubs including América de Cali, Atlético Paranaense, FC Dallas and the Colombia national team. In December 2019, the younger Ferreira received U.S. citizenship.

Career statistics

Club

International 

Scores and results list the United States' goal tally first.

Honors
Individual
MLS All-Star: 2022
MLS Young Player of the Year: 2022
MLS Best XI: 2022

References

2000 births
Living people
People from Santa Marta
People from McKinney, Texas
American soccer players
United States men's international soccer players
Colombian footballers
American sportspeople of Colombian descent
Colombian emigrants to the United States
Association football forwards
FC Dallas players
Major League Soccer players
Soccer players from Texas
FC Tulsa players
USL Championship players
Homegrown Players (MLS)
United States men's under-23 international soccer players
Designated Players (MLS)
2022 FIFA World Cup players
Sportspeople from Magdalena Department